Maria Quiban (born Maria T. Aviso) is a weather anchor for KTTV in Los Angeles, California.

Early life
Quiban was born Maria T. Aviso in Cebu City, Philippines. At the age of 9, her family moved to Honolulu, Hawaii where she attended Aiea High School and later studied journalism at the University of Hawaii.

Career 
Quiban worked for the local NBC affiliate KHNL in Honolulu before moving in 1998 to Los Angeles to work as the weather anchor for the Orange County Newschannel. In 2000, she accepted employment as the weather anchor/meteorologist for KTTV. In 2005, she earned a B.S. in meteorology from Mississippi State University via correspondence courses.

Quiban has appeared in numerous television shows and films playing a reporter including Bruce Almighty, Cold Case, Everybody Hates Chris, Criminal Minds and Ryan's Mystery Playdate. She played the role of a murder victim in the film Blood Work.

In 2020, Quiban released her book "You Can't Do It Alone- A Widow's Journey Through Loss, Grief, and Life After."

Personal  life
Quiban has been married three times. While a teenager in Honolulu, she married her first husband; they had one child, Desmond Quiban (born 1987). On September 9, 1999, she married her second husband, Brian Messner and they divorced in 2001. Her third husband, Sean Whitesell, died of glioblastoma multiforme on December 28, 2015. They had one son, Gus Whitesell (born 2010).

References

External links
 KTTV Fox 11 On-Air Talent Bios
 Maria Quiban Facebook Page
 
 

Living people
American writers of Filipino descent
American television actresses
American film actresses
Actresses from Hawaii
People from Honolulu
Mississippi State University alumni
University of Hawaiʻi at Mānoa alumni
American women television journalists
Whitesell family
21st-century American women
Year of birth missing (living people)